This article details a comparison of audio recording mediums.

Comparison

The typical duration of a vinyl album is about 15 to 25 minutes per side. Classical music and spoken word recordings can extend to over 30 minutes on a side.  If a side exceeds the average time, the maximum groove amplitude is reduced to make room for the additional program material.  This can cause hiss in the sound from lower quality amplifiers when the volume is turned up to compensate for the lower recorded level.  An extreme example, Todd Rundgren's  Initiation LP, with 36 minutes of music on one side, has a "technical note" at the bottom of the inner sleeve: "if the sound does not seem loud enough on your system, try re-recording the music onto tape." The total of around 40–45 minutes often influences the arrangement of tracks, with the preferred positions being the opening and closing tracks of each side.

Although the term EP is commonly used to describe a 7" single with more than two tracks, technically they are not different from a normal 7" single. The EP uses reduced dynamic range and a smaller run-off groove area to extend the playing time. However, there are examples of singles, such as The Beatles' "Hey Jude" or Queen's "Bohemian Rhapsody", which are six minutes long or more. (in 1989, RCA released 'Dreamtime' by the band Love and Rockets, which clocks at 8:40). These longer recordings would require the same technical approach as an EP. The term EP has also been used for 10" 45 rpm records, typically containing a reduced number of tracks.

Vinyl albums have a large 12" (30 cm) album cover, which also allows cover designers scope for imaginative designs, often including fold-outs and leaflets.

See also 
Audio format
Audio storage
CardTalk
DJ
Hard drive
Magnetic cartridge
RCA
Record changer
Record press
Sound recording
Unusual types of gramophone records
Voyager Golden Record
Vinyl Emulation Software

References 

Lawrence, Harold; "Mercury Living Presence." Compact disc liner notes. Bartók, Antal Dorati, Mercury 432 017-2. 1991.
International standard IEC 60098: Analogue audio disk records and reproducing equipment. Third edition, International Electrotechnical Commission, 1987.
College Physics, Sears, Zemansky, Young, 1974, LOC #73-21135, chapter: Acoustic Phenomena

Further reading 
From Tin Foil to Stereo — Evolution of the Phonograph by Oliver Read and Walter L. Welch.
Where have all the good times gone? — the rise and fall of the record industry Louis Barfe.
Pressing the LP record by Ellingham, Niel, published at 1 Bruach Lane, PH16 5DG, Scotland.

External links 
Creating a vinyl record
YouTube — Record Making With Duke Ellington (1937) A look at how early 78 rpm records were made.
Kiddie Records Weekly — Recordings and case images from children's records of the 1940s and 1950s.

Recorded music
Technological comparisons